William Francis Morris (born 30 March 1955) is a South African former first-class cricketer.

Morris was a slow left-arm orthodox bowler and lower-order batsman. He represented Northern Transvaal Schools in the 1972/3 Nuffield Week and made his senior debut for Northern Transvaal in October 1973 in the Gillette Cup. He played for Northern Transvaal from 1973 until 1991.

He is the father of South African international cricketer Chris Morris.

References

External links
 

1955 births
Living people
South African cricketers
Northerns cricketers
Cricketers from Pretoria